Hong Kong Ferry (Holdings) Company Limited is a holding company in Hong Kong involved in property development, ferry, shipyard, travel and hotel operations. It operated franchised ferry services in Hong Kong until 2000, when its ferry licence was transferred to New World First Ferry. Its remaining marine businesses are dangerous goods vehicular ferry service, vessel chartering, floating restaurants and marine diesel oil trading.

The company was formerly the Hongkong and Yaumati Ferry Company which was established in 1923. After it was acquired by Henderson Land Development and a corporate restructuring in 1989, the holding company was renamed Hong Kong Ferry (Holdings) Company Limited and Hongkong and Yaumati Ferry became the subsidiary of Hong Kong Ferry (Holdings).

Its head office is in North Tsing Yi.

Hong Kong Shipyard
The company operates Hong Kong Shipyard, on the north coast of Tsing Yi, through its wholly owned subsidiary, The Hong Kong Shipyard Limited, incorporated in 1948. With a workforce of 140, the shipyard undertakes repair and maintenance of vessels, as well as shipbuilding, and can drydock up to ten vessels simultaneously.

See also
Star Ferry

References

External links 

Hong Kong Ferry (Holdings) Company Limited

Conglomerate companies established in 1989
Companies listed on the Hong Kong Stock Exchange
Conglomerate companies of China
Ferry transport in Hong Kong
Land developers of Hong Kong
Henderson Land Development
Conglomerate companies of Hong Kong